is a Japanese footballer for Ococias Kyoto AC.

Career
He joined S-Pulse after graduating at Komazawa University and plays in the forward position.

Career statistics
Updated to 23 February 2020.

Club

International

Appearances in major competitions

References

External links

Profile at Giravanz Kitakyushu
Profile at Kamatamare Sanuki
Yahoo! Sports Profile 

1985 births
Living people
Komazawa University alumni
Association football people from Chiba Prefecture
Japanese footballers
J1 League players
J2 League players
J3 League players
Shimizu S-Pulse players
Urawa Red Diamonds players
Kyoto Sanga FC players
Giravanz Kitakyushu players
Kamatamare Sanuki players
Roasso Kumamoto players
Ococias Kyoto AC players
Association football forwards
Universiade medalists in football
Universiade gold medalists for Japan